The Kawachi Genji were members of a family line within that of the Seiwa Genji, which in turn was one of several branches of the Minamoto clan, one of the most famous noble clans in Japanese history. Descended from Minamoto no Yorinobu (968–1048), the Kawachi Genji included Minamoto no Yoshiie (1041–1108), who fought in the Zenkunen War and Gosannen War, and common ancestor of nearly all the major Minamoto generals of the Genpei War from which the Minamoto are famous.

Lineage
Note: Each degree of indentation indicates a father-son relationship.

Yorinobu (968–1048) – son of Minamoto no Mitsunaka
Yoriyoshi (998–1082) – son of Yorinobu; hero of the Zenkunen War
Yoshitsuna (died 1134) – son of Yoriyoshi
Yoshimitsu (died 1127) – son of Yoriyoshi, ancestor of the Satake, Hiraga, and Takeda families
Yoshiie (1041–1108) – son of Yoriyoshi, fought alongside his father in the Zenkunen War, led imperial forces in the Gosannen War
Yoshichika
Tameyoshi (1096–1156) – grandson of Yoshiie
Yoshitomo (1123–1160), son of Tameyoshi
Yoshihira (1140–1160), son of Yoshitomo
Yoritomo (1147–1199), son of Yoshitomo, and first Kamakura shōgun
Yoriie (1182–1204), son of Yoritomo, and 2nd shōgun of the Kamakura Shogunate
Sanetomo(*) (1192–1219), son of Yoritomo, and 3rd shōgun of the Kamakura Shogunate
Noriyori (1156–1193), son of Yoshitomo
Yoshitsune (1159–1189), son of Yoshitomo, and one of the most famous samurai of all time
Tametomo (1139–1170), son of Tameyoshi
Yoshikata (？–1155), son of Tameyoshi
Yoshinaka (1154–1184), son of Yoshikata
Yukiie (d. 1186), son of Tameyoshi

(*)= During 1219 as Shogunate Minamoto Sanetomo was last head of Minamoto clan of Japan after his nephew Minamoto Kugyo – son of Yoriie – killed his uncle Sanemoto then will commit suicide himself. Also other nephew Ichiman – who was Yoriie's son. In 1203? he was executed on Hōjō's orders.

References
 Sansom, George (1958). A History of Japan to 1334. Stanford, California: Stanford University Press.
 Turnbull, Stephen (1998). The Samurai Sourcebook. London: Cassell & Co.

Minamoto clan